Air was a free jazz trio founded by saxophone player Henry Threadgill, double bassist Fred Hopkins, and drummer Steve McCall  in 1971.

Career
Threadgill was asked by Columbia College in Chicago to arrange a number of Scott Joplin songs. Joplin was so strongly associated with piano, that the musicians enjoyed the challenge of performing his trademark songs without piano. They opted to play them as rags and as a basis for jazz improvization.

The album Air Lore contains improvizations over songs by Scott Joplin as well as selections by Jelly Roll Morton.

Air broke up and reformed several times, and after McCall's death, Andrew Cyrille performed as part of the trio. They released two albums with drummer Pheeroan Aklaff as New Air on Black Saint Records.

Discography

References

Free jazz ensembles
American jazz ensembles from Illinois
Antilles Records artists
India Navigation artists
Novus Records artists
Nessa Records artists
Avant-garde jazz ensembles
Musical groups established in 1971